Habronattus mataxus is a species of jumping spider found in Texas and northern Mexico.

Description
Both males and females resemble Habronattus cognatus. The male differs by having a darker clypeus and no spines on the first tibia.

References

External links

 

Salticidae
Articles created by Qbugbot
Spiders described in 1987